The Blackstairs Mountains run roughly north/south along the border between County Carlow and County Wexford in Ireland. The highest peak is Mount Leinster with a total height of 2612 ft/ 796 metres.

See also
List of mountains in Ireland

Other projects

Mountains and hills of County Carlow
Mountains and hills of County Wexford